Silvia Gabriela Lospennato (born 21 December 1977) is an Argentine political scientist and politician, currently serving as National Deputy elected in Buenos Aires Province since 2015. She is a member of Republican Proposal (PRO).

Lospennato was previously Undersecretary of Government in the City of Buenos Aires during the mayoralty of Mauricio Macri.

Early life and education
Lospennato was born on 21 December 1977 in Buenos Aires. She studied Political Science at the University of Buenos Aires Faculty of Social Sciences, graduating in 2003, and counts with a degree on Technology and Environmental Law from the Instituto Tecnológico de Buenos Aires. She is married and has two children.

Political career
Lospennato began her career in the City Government of Buenos Aires during the administration of Mauricio Macri. Up until 2014, she was in charge of the Special Projects Unit of the Matanza Riachuelo Basin Authority (ACUMAR). Later, from January to December 2015, she was Undersecretary of Government of Buenos Aires.

She ran for a seat in the Chamber of Deputies in the 2015 legislative election, as the first candidate in the Cambiemos list in Buenos Aires Province. She was initially supposed to be the second candidate in the list, until the resignation of Fernando Niembro from the position. The list came second with 33.75% of the vote, and Lospennato was elected. She was re-elected in 2019, this time as the fourth candidate in the Juntos por el Cambio list.

As a national deputy, Lospennato was a vocal supporter of the legalization of abortion in Argentina. She voted in favour of the two Voluntary Interruption of Pregnancy bills that were debated by the Argentine Congress in 2018 and 2020. Her closing speech during the 2018 debate was highlighted by Brut Magazine as one of the decade's "best feminist speeches".

References

External links

Profile on the official website of the Chamber of Deputies (in Spanish)

Living people
1977 births
Argentine political scientists
Women political scientists
Members of the Argentine Chamber of Deputies elected in Buenos Aires Province
Women members of the Argentine Chamber of Deputies
Politicians from Buenos Aires
Republican Proposal politicians
University of Buenos Aires alumni
21st-century Argentine politicians
21st-century Argentine women politicians